Estádio Jonas Duarte is a multi-use stadium located in Anápolis, Brazil. It is used mostly for football matches and hosts the home matches of Associação Atlética Anapolina, Anápolis Futebol Clube, Grêmio Esportivo Anápolis and Grêmio Esportivo Inhumense. The stadium has a maximum capacity of 20,000 people and was built in 1965. It is named after Jonas Ferreira Alves Duarte, who was the mayor of Anápolis in the 1950s, and was Goiás state vice-governor in 1954 and in 1955.

History
The stadium was inaugurated on April 10, 1965, when São Paulo beat an Anápolis City Combined Team 4–1. The first goal of the stadium was scored by São Paulo's player Paraná.

The stadium's attendance record currently stands at 17,800 people, set on September 15, 1981, when Anapolina and Corinthians drew 1-1.

References

External links
Templos do Futebol

Jonas Duarte
Sports venues in Goiás